Janmeja Singh Sekhon is an Indian politician and belongs to the ruling Shiromani Akali Dal. He is Minister for PWD in the present Punjab Government. He has been holding this post since 2007.

Personal life
His father's name is Gurdit Singh. His brother Justice (retd) Jai Singh Sekhon is the Lokpal of Punjab.
He has a son (Preetinder Singh Sekhon) and a daughter (Prabhleen Sekhon).

Political career
He was first elected for the Punjab Legislative Assembly in 1997 as an Akali Dal candidate from Firozepur Cantonment.
He was again elected in 2007 from Firozepur Cantonment. In the Parkash Singh Badal government he was made Minister of Irrigation. In 2012 he successfully contested from new constituency Maur. In the new government, he retained Irrigation ministry.

Electoral performance

References

Shiromani Akali Dal politicians
State cabinet ministers of Punjab, India
Living people
Indian Sikhs
Punjab, India MLAs 2012–2017
Punjab, India MLAs 2007–2012
Date of birth unknown
Place of birth missing (living people)
Punjab, India MLAs 1997–2002
People from Firozpur
People from Bathinda
Year of birth missing (living people)